Ghazyatan (also Romanized as Ghāzyātān; also known as Ghār Yātān, Qāzītūn, Qazīyātān, and Qāzyātān) is a village in Razan Rural District, in the Central District of Razan County, Hamadan Province, Iran. At the 2006 census, its population was 160, in 48 families.

References 

Populated places in Razan County